The Eire Pub is an Irish pub in Dorchester, Massachusetts.

President Ronald Reagan and then future president Bill Clinton both visited the pub; since then, stopping at Eire Pub has become a superstition for political candidates hoping to follow in Reagan and Clinton's footsteps. Bertie Ahern, the then-Prime Minister of Ireland, visited the pub in 2008.

Martin Nicholson, bartender at the Eire Pub for 33 years, retired in 2010.

References

External links
 Official website

Drinking establishments in Boston
Dorchester, Boston